George Bunter is an English former professional rugby league footballer who played in the 1940s.

Playing career

International honours
George Bunter won a cap for England while at Broughton Rangers in 1940 against Wales.

Championship final appearances
George Bunter played right-, i.e. number 12, in Dewsbury's 14-25 aggregate defeat by Wigan in the Championship Final during the 1943–44 season; the 9-13 first-leg defeat at Central Park, Wigan on Saturday 13 May 1944, and the 5-12 second-leg defeat at Crown Flatt, Dewsbury on Saturday 20 May 1944.

References

External links

Living people
Broughton Rangers players
Dewsbury Rams players
England national rugby league team players
English rugby league players
Place of birth missing (living people)
Rugby league second-rows
Year of birth missing (living people)